Through the Storm is the second studio album by American gospel singer Yolanda Adams. It was released by Tribute Records on December 26, 1991 in the United States.

Track listing
Credits taken from the album's liner notes.

Charts

References

1991 albums
Yolanda Adams albums